The Rt Rev Rawle Ernest Douglin is a former Bishop of Trinidad and Tobago.

Educated at Kelham Theological College, he was ordained in 1960 and began his ecclesiastical career with a curacy at All Saints Port of Spain. After this he served incumbencies at  St. Stephen's, Princes Town The Good Shepherd, Tunapuna and All Saints’ Church, Newtown. Later he was Dean of Holy Trinity Cathedral in Port of Spain before his elevation to the episcopate in 1992, serving for ten years.

Notes and references

Living people
Deans of Trinidad
20th-century Anglican bishops in the Caribbean
21st-century Anglican bishops in the Caribbean
Anglican bishops of Trinidad and Tobago
Year of birth missing (living people)